Jurist may refer to:
Jurist is a person with expert knowledge of law; someone who analyses and comments on law.
Faqīh is an Islamic jurist, an expert in fiqh, or Islamic jurisprudence and law.
JURIST is online legal news service.
The Jurist (journal), or The Jurist: Studies in Church Law and Ministry, is a peer-reviewed academic journal.
The Jurist (painting) is an Italian painting, painted in 1566.